The Rt. Rev. Thomas Moigne   was an Anglican bishop in Ireland.

Moigne was born in Cadeby, Lincolnshire and educated at Peterhouse, Cambridge. He was ordained in 1588; and held the living at Cherry Hinton until his appointment as Archdeacon of Armagh in 1606. From 1608 until 1625 he was Dean of St Patrick's Cathedral, Dublin; and from 1613 until his death on 1 January 1629, Bishop of Kilmore and Ardagh.

References

People from Lincolnshire
1629 deaths
Deans of St. Patrick's Cathedral, Dublin
Bishops of Kilmore and Ardagh
Archdeacons of Meath